Curling was an event at the Asian Winter Games in 2003 and 2007. The event returned to the sports program in 2017 after missing 2011.

Summaries

Men

Women

Medal table

Participating nations

Men

Women

List of medalists

References 

Sports123

 
Sports at the Asian Winter Games
Asian Games